Linda is a 1960 British teen drama film, directed by Don Sharp and starring Carol White and Alan Rothwell.

The film was shot on location in South London and Brighton, and played in cinemas as the support feature to Saturday Night and Sunday Morning.  Unseen for decades, this is currently considered a lost film, and is on the British Film Institute's "75 Most Wanted" list of missing British feature films.

Plot
Bored South London teenager Phil (Rothwell) joins a gang led by the Chief (Cavan Malone) and begins to be drawn into a world of petty crime and violence.  When he meets Linda (White), his interest begins to shift away from the gang and towards her.  She tries to pull him away from the gang's bad influence.

The couple go on a day trip to Brighton.  On the way home Phil makes a pass at Linda, but is rebuffed as she tells him she is not that kind of girl.  Later, the local coffee bar which acts as the gang's territory is threatened by incomers.  The Chief musters his minions, and Phil agrees to join in after being duped into thinking that Linda is playing fast and loose with another boy.  After the ruck, Phil finds out that he has been tricked by the Chief.  Urged by the progressively-minded local vicar, he decides to leave the gang behind.  Other members also see the light and join him, leaving the Chief on his own.  Phil and Linda discuss the possibility of marriage.

Cast

 Carol White as Linda
 Alan Rothwell as Phil
 Cavan Malone as Chief
 Edward Cast as Vicar
 Vivienne Lacey as Rosie
 Lois Daine as Clara

 Larry Dann as Len
 Keith Faulkner as Joe
 Harry Pringle as Fred
 Richard Palmer as Teddy
 Tony Lyons as Dave
 Pearson Dodd as Jack

Production
Don Sharp was offered the job of directing by Independent Artists who were pleased with the job he had just done for them on The Professionals. The film was made for Bryanston, and designed to play the bottom half of a double bill for that company. Filming began 23 May 1960.

The film was shot over 15 days. Don Sharp said the key to making a film with such a tight schedule was preplanning. He said, "Obviously you cannot do all the covering that you might on a longer schedule. So you plan to eliminate cover shots wherever possible to give yourself extra time for those sequences where you need them for dramatic cutting."

Reception
As a second feature, Linda received only passing attention from contemporary critics. The Cinema Exhibitors' Association commented favourably: "This is an unpretentious but amusing little film which combines action with humour and even some charm."  The Monthly Film Bulletin was less enthusiastic, saying: "The author of this story would seem to be afraid of his subject. He steers a middle course which is neither one thing nor the other.  Carol White does her best to look the part of a young tart-type, and Alan Rothwell is dressed for the part, but neither make much of an impression."

The film is considered of potential interest to cinema historians, both as an early directorial outing by Sharp and as a period piece capturing a very specific moment in British social history, with the additional nostalgia appeal of location shots of 1960 Brighton and Battersea Fun Fair.

Preservation status
This is considered a lost film, and is on the British Film Institute's "75 Most Wanted" list of missing British feature films.

See also
List of lost films

References

External links 
 
 Linda at BFI Film & TV Database
 BFI 75 Most Wanted entry, with extensive notes

1960 films
1960s teen drama films
1960 independent films
1960s lost films
British black-and-white films
British independent films
British teen drama films
Films directed by Don Sharp
Films set in Brighton
Films set in London
Lost British films
Lost drama films
1960 drama films
1960s English-language films
1960s British films